Recognition of the Japanese Zero Fighter (also known as Jap Zero) is a 1943 educational dramatic short produced by the United States Army Air Forces during World War II. The film's purpose was to instruct pilots in the Pacific theater about recognizing hostile planes at long distances and avoid "friendly fire" incidents.

Plot
Most of the film is taken up with a short play in which a young pilot, portrayed by Ronald Reagan, is ordered on reconnaissance missions of the Pacific. He encounters another plane and cannot tell if it is friendly or not. This plot is interspersed with animated segments illustrating the physical characteristics of the Japanese Zero and how it can be distinguished from an American plane.

Influence
Scenes from Jap Zero appear in If You Love This Planet, a 1982 documentary short about the dangers of nuclear weapons.

References

External links 
 
 

1943 films
American World War II propaganda shorts
Films directed by Bernard Vorhaus
American black-and-white films
American aviation films
First Motion Picture Unit films
Articles containing video clips
American war drama films
1940s war films
1943 drama films
Japan in non-Japanese culture
1940s American films